Aéromusical is the first studio album by the French power pop group Superbus, released in 2002. It reached 96th place on the French album charts. It consists of 11 original songs and one cover ("Into the Groove", originally by Madonna).

Track listing
All tracks by Jennifer Ayache except where noted.

 "Je reste encore" – 2:29
 "Superstar" (Ayache, Patrice Focone) – 3:14
 "Tchi-cum-bah" – 2:23
 "Le soleil" – 3:30
 "Le loup" (Ayache, Focone) – 3:19
 "Aéromusical" – 2:23
 "Something wrong" – 3:41
 "Ennemie" – 2:45
 "À travers toi" – 4:08
 "Into the Groove" (Stephen Bray, Madonna Ciccone) – 2:51
 "Helping hand" – 3:01
 "Sans décrocher" – 3:51
 "Miss Underground" - 3:17
 "No School Today" - 2:57

Personnel 
Jennifer Ayache – acoustic guitar, voices, clavier, guiro
Jimi D – digital engineer
François Even – chorus, bass guitar
Patrice Focone – electric guitar, slide guitar, chorus
Michel Giovannetti – guitar, chorus
Clive Martin – engineer, mixing
Nilesh "Nilz" Patel – mastering
Rodolphe Sampieri – assistant

References

2002 debut albums
Superbus (band) albums
Mercury Records albums